Hunchun National Nature Reserve is a protected area in the Changbai Mountains in northeastern China's Jilin Province. Wildlife recorded in the reserve include Siberian tiger, Amur leopard, sika deer, roe deer, red deer and wild boar.

References 

Nature reserves in China
Geography of Jilin